Sir Thomas Ingram Kynaston Lloyd GCMG KCB (19 June 1896 – 9 December 1968), was a British civil servant who held the position of Permanent Under-Secretary of State for the Colonies from 1947 to 1956.

Family and education
Born in Shifnal, Shropshire, Lloyd was the eldest son of John Charles Lloyd, a corn merchant, and Henrietta Elizabeth Brown.  He was educated at the Rossall School in Lancashire, leaving in 1915 with an open scholarship in mathematics. He graduated from the Royal Military Academy Sandhurst in 1916 with the rank of Second Lieutenant.

In 1922 he married Bessie Nora Mason (1901–1992), with whom he had a son, George Peter Lloyd (1926–2007), who served as Governor of the Cayman Islands from 1982 to 1987.

Career
Lloyd entered the British Civil Service after the First World War, serving as Assistant Principal at the Ministry of Health before joining the Colonial Office in 1921. He was appointed Principal Clerk in 1929, Assistant Secretary in 1939 and Permanent Under-Secretary of State for the Colonies in 1947, a position he held until 1956.

He wrote the foreword to Sir Charles Jeffries’s book, The Colonial Office, which was published in 1956.

He died on 9 December 1968 at the age of 72.

Honours
Lloyd was made a Companion of the Order of St Michael and St George (CMG) in 1943, a Knight Commander of the Order of St Michael and St George (KCMG) in 1947, a Knight Commander of the Order of the Bath (KCB) in 1949 and a Knight Grand Cross of the Order of St Michael and St George (GCMG) in 1951.

References

1896 births
1968 deaths
People from Shifnal
People educated at Rossall School
Knights Grand Cross of the Order of St Michael and St George
Knights Commander of the Order of the Bath
Civil servants in the Colonial Office
Permanent Under-Secretaries of State for the Colonies